Barcice may refer to the following villages in Poland:
 Barcice, Lesser Poland Voivodeship in Lesser Poland Voivodeship (south Poland)
 Barcice, Masovian Voivodeship in Masovian Voivodeship (central Poland)
 Barcice, Pomeranian Voivodeship in Pomeranian Voivodeship (north Poland)